"Everybody in the Place" is the second official single released by the British electronic dance band the Prodigy from their debut album, Experience (1992). It was released on 23 December 1991 through XL Recordings in the UK.

The single features the "Fairground Remix" version of the song. The version on the album is the "155 & Rising Version", which is significantly longer and faster in beats per minute than the original mix featured on the What Evil Lurks EP.

The single peaked at number two on the UK Singles Chart, beaten to number one by the re-release of Queen's "Bohemian Rhapsody" following the death of Freddie Mercury.

The original CD single was released with five tracks, which went against British chart regulations. The track "Rip Up the Sound System" was removed on the re-issue to comply with the chart regulations, but is still available on the 12" vinyl. The cover features a photograph of the now dismantled Corkscrew roller coaster at Alton Towers.

The song was released six months later on 18 June 1992 as a double A-side with first single "Charly" through Elektra Records in the United States. The single is featured on the band's greatest hits compilation Their Law: The Singles 1990–2005.

Music video
The accompanying music video was shot in September 1991 during a trip to New York, during which they also played at the Limelight Club. It features the band dancing in a fast-paced succession of short shots. The video ends with the band appearing to be pursued by the police but escaping.

Track listings
7-inch vinyl record
A. "Everybody in the Place" (Fairground Edit) (3:49)
B. "G-Force" (Energy Flow) (4:41)

12-inch vinyl record
A1. "Everybody in the Place" (Fairground Remix) (5:08)
A2. "Crazy Man" (Original Version) (4:01)
B1. "G-Force" (Energy Flow) (Original Version) (5:18)
B2. "Rip up the Sound System" (Original Version) (4:04)

CD1
 "Everybody in the Place" (Fairground Edit) (3:51)
 "G-Force" (Energy Flow) (5:18)
 "Crazy Man" (4:01)
 "Rip up the Sound System" (4:04)
 "Everybody in the Place" (Fairground Remix) (5:08)

CD2
 "Everybody in the Place" (Fairground Edit) (3:51)
 "G-Force" (Energy Flow) (5:18)
 "Crazy Man" (4:01)
 "Everybody in the Place" (Fairground remix) (5:08)

Charts

Weekly charts

Year-end charts

Media references
The artist Jeremy Deller used the same title for a 2019 film about UK rave culture, even though the band does not appear in it.

References

The Prodigy songs
1991 singles
1991 songs
Music Week number-one dance singles
Songs written by Liam Howlett
XL Recordings singles